Royal Armoury may refer to:

 Livrustkammaren ("The Royal Armoury"), a museum in the Royal Palace in Stockholm
 Royal Armouries, the United Kingdom's National Museum of Arms and Armour
 Royal Armouries Museum, in Leeds